Mario Gosselin (born June 15, 1963) is a Canadian former hockey goaltender who played nine years in the National Hockey League (NHL) for the Quebec Nordiques, the Los Angeles Kings and the Hartford Whalers.

Playing career
As a youth, Gosselin played in the 1975 and 1976 Quebec International Pee-Wee Hockey Tournaments with a minor ice hockey team from Thetford Mines.

Gosselin played his junior hockey for the Shawinigan Cataractes of the QMJHL from 1980–1981 to 1982–1983. He was drafted by the Quebec Nordiques with 55th pick (third round) of the 1982 NHL Entry Draft.

He then represented Canada at the 1983 World Junior Championships as a spare goalie than continued to play for Canada joining the national team for the 1984 Sarajevo Olympics where he played seven games winning four of them and helping Canada finish fourth.

Quebec Nordiques
Following the Games, he joined the Nordiques making a memorable debut on February 26, 1984 by blanking the St. Louis Blues 5–0.

The following year he formed a tandem with veteran Dan Bouchard and took over the starting job for good by playoff time helping backstop the Nordiques past the Buffalo Sabres in the first round and their fierce rivals the Montreal Canadiens in the second round before falling to the Philadelphia Flyers in the Semi-Finals.

The 1985-86 season had highs and lows for Gosselin.  He battled for ice time with newcomer Clint Malarchuk and veteran Richard Sevigny and played well enough to be selected to play in the 1986 All-Star Game, but also struggled enough to spend five games in the American Hockey League with the Fredericton Express.   His season ended on a high note, however, when Gosselin excelled for the Nordiques in the post-season going 7-4 after taking over the crease from Malarchuk.

He spent the next season in a back-up role but returned to the starting job in 1987-88 after Malarchuk was traded to the Washington Capitals. Gosselin and the Nordiques had a forgettable season and the following year, with veteran Bob Mason signed and rookie Ron Tugnutt pushing for starts Gosselin saw his playing time cut and again had a brief stint in the AHL.   After the season, the Nordiques didn't renew his contract on June 6, 1989 and he signed with the Los Angeles Kings.

Los Angeles Kings

Gosselin served as the back-up to Kelly Hrudey but was largely ineffective posting a 7-11-1 record with a 3.87 goals against average. He did manage to get in the history books during his time with the Kings, even if it was for dubious reasons. Mario Gosselin was the first goaltender in NHL history to lose a game without giving up a goal. Gosselin filled in for Kelly Hrudey and the Kings would give up an empty net goal. The result was a 7-6 loss to the Edmonton Oilers.

When the Kings acquired netminder Daniel Berthiaume the following off-season, Gosselin lost his job and spent the 1990-91 season as the starting goalie with the Kings International Hockey League affiliate in Phoenix.

Hartford Whalers

In 1991-92, he signed with the Hartford Whalers but failed to return to the NHL that year and ended up spending his second consecutive season at the minor league level playing for the Springfield Indians of the American Hockey League.  During training camp before the 1992-93 campaign, Gosselin suffered a serious back injury  that cost him four months. The injury was so serious, Gosselin feared his career might have been over. "At a certain point in December, they told me maybe I would never play again.  All I wanted to do was play hockey again."  He worked his way back into the Springfield lineup but an injury to Whaler back-up Frank Pietrangelo brought him back to the NHL after nearly three years away.  Shortly after, starter Sean Burke suffered back spasms and suddenly Gosselin was an NHL starter again.  In 16 games with the Whalers that year he posted better numbers than incumbents Burke and Pietrangelo and impressed the Whaler brass enough to earn a new two year contract that March.  The following season, he played 2 games in Springfield and 7 in Hartford before suffering a knee injury on November 27th, 1993 in a game against the Florida Panthers that ultimately ended his season and career.

Personal life
After retirement, Gosselin worked as a radio analyst for the Roadrunners games and hockey coordinator at the YMCA before moving back to the province of Quebec in 1997. He now lives in Saint-Basile-le-grand with his wife, three sons (Francis, Yanick, Justin) and daughter Marylee. Gosselin owns a hockey school called "Ecole de Hockey Mario Gosselin" and works at various high schools as a goaltender coach for their ice hockey programs.

Career statistics

Regular season and playoffs

International

References

External links

Profile at hockeydraftcentral.com

1963 births
Living people
Canadian ice hockey goaltenders
Fredericton Express players
French Quebecers
Halifax Citadels players
Hartford Whalers players
Sportspeople from Thetford Mines
Ice hockey players at the 1984 Winter Olympics
Los Angeles Kings players
National Hockey League All-Stars
Olympic ice hockey players of Canada
Phoenix Roadrunners (IHL) players
Quebec Nordiques draft picks
Quebec Nordiques players
Shawinigan Cataractes players
Springfield Indians players
Ice hockey people from Quebec